Perper is a Montenegrin pop rock band from Cetinje. The band was founded in December 1991 and today it's one of Montenegros most popular rock bands.

Members
Niko (Nikola Radunović; born 1974) - vocals, acoustic guitar
Popaj (Aleksandar Radunović; born 1971) - guitar; accompanying vocals
Mane (Ivan Vujović; born 1971) - drums
Zeko (Momčilo Zeković; born 1967 ) - bass guitar
Mikelanđelo (Mihailo Ražnatović; born 1972) - keyboards, accompanying vocals

Notes
Band guitarist Aleksandar Radunović Popaj is also a member of alternative group The Books of Knjige.

Discography

Sa gomile velikih oblaka (1992)
Bludni snovi (1993)
Perper uživo iz CNP-a (2002)
Iz dana u dan (2002)
Tragovi (2008)

Singles
Mir kao peto godišnje doba (1991)
Godine (1992)
Još uvijek čekam te (1997)
Sa dušom od kamena (2000)
Neđelja (2000)
Dodir svile (2004)
Hrabri sokoli (2007)
Niz tvoja leđa (2015)
Sloboda (2019)

Compilations
Kompilacisko izdanje (1998)

References

Montenegrin musical groups